The E.B. Wilson Medal is the American Society for Cell Biology's highest honor for science and is presented at the Annual Meeting of the Society for significant and far-reaching contributions to cell biology over the course of a career.  It is named after Edmund Beecher Wilson.

Medalists 
Source : ASCB

See also

 List of medicine awards

References

American Society for Cell Biology
Medicine awards
Biology awards
American awards
Awards established in 1981